R30: 30th Anniversary World Tour is a live DVD by the Canadian rock band Rush, released on November 22, 2005 in Canada and the US, and November 28, 2005 in Europe. The DVD documents the band's R30: 30th Anniversary Tour, and was recorded on September 24, 2004 at the Festhalle Frankfurt, Germany.

The DVD was released in both a standard and a deluxe set. The deluxe version features two additional audio CDs of the DVD content, as well as various interviews, and extra live footage.

To reduce overlap with the band's 2003 release Rush in Rio, eight songs were cut from both DVD versions: "Bravado", "One Little Victory", "By-Tor and the Snow Dog", "La Villa Strangiato", "YYZ", "Red Sector A", "The Trees", and "Secret Touch". The audio CDs in the deluxe DVD version present the shortened set-list as well. Five of the deleted songs were later released:

 "Red Sector A" on the Snakes & Arrows Live DVD (2008)
 "Secret Touch" on the DVD included with the two-disc version of the Retrospective III: 1989–2008 compilation (2009)
 "One Little Victory" on the DVD included with the two-disc version of the Working Men compilation (2009)
 "Bravado" and "YYZ" as bonus features for the home media release of the documentary film Rush: Beyond the Lighted Stage (2010)

The R30 track "Der Trommler" is a drum solo by Neil Peart. The track "R30 Overture" is an instrumental medley of six early Rush songs, one from each of the first six studio albums, with flashes of the band's history appearing in the background at the concerts. The R30 releases also feature four songs from the band's 2004 "cover" EP Feedback.

A Blu-ray version of R30, containing the complete concert, was released on December 8, 2009 in the US, and in late 2013 in Europe.

Track listing

DVD disc 1
 "R30 Overture" - ("Finding My Way"/"Anthem"/"Bastille Day"/"A Passage to Bangkok"/"Cygnus X-1 Book I: The Voyage, Book II: Hemispheres")
 "The Spirit of Radio"
 "Force Ten"
 "Animate"
 "Subdivisions"
 "Earthshine"
 "Red Barchetta"
 "Roll the Bones"
 "The Seeker"
 "Tom Sawyer"
 "Dreamline"
 "Between the Wheels"
 "Mystic Rhythms"
 "Der Trommler" (Neil Peart's drum solo)
 "Resist" (the acoustic arrangement first heard on Rush in Rio)
 "Heart Full of Soul"
 "2112" ("Overture"/"Temples of Syrinx"/"Grand Finale")
 "Xanadu" (abbreviated version)
 "Working Man"
 "Summertime Blues"
 "Crossroads"
 "Limelight"

Running Time: 2 hours 10 minutes

DVD disc 2
 1979: Interview with Geddy Lee at Ivor Wynne Stadium – Tour of the Hemispheres (10:00)
 1980: Interview at Le Studio recording studio in Quebec featuring all three members together, on the making of the Permanent Waves album (13:00)
 1990: Juno Awards Artist of the Decade interviews (1980s) featuring all three members separately (15:34)
 1994: CBC Television: Juno Awards news report - Induction of Rush into the Canadian Music Hall of Fame, presented by Tom Cochrane (17:33)
 2002: Interview with Geddy Lee and Alex Lifeson for the release of the album Vapor Trails (12:51)
 "Fly by Night" - Church Session Video (1975)
 "Finding My Way" - from the band's appearance on Don Kirshner's Rock Concert (1975)
 "In the Mood" - Same performance as above
 "Circumstances"
 "La Villa Strangiato"
 "A Farewell to Kings" - Seneca College Theatre (1977)
 "Xanadu" - Seneca College Theatre (1977)
 "The Spirit of Radio" - sound check at Ivor Wynne Stadium (1979)
 "Freewill" - Toronto Rocks festival performance (2003)
 "Closer to the Heart" - Canadian Tsunami Disaster Fund charity telethon performance on CBC Television, with Ed Robertson of the Barenaked Ladies and Mike Smith in character as Bubbles of the Trailer Park Boys (2005)
 1988: Rush hits St. John's (Easter egg) - Interviews with Geddy Lee and fans prior to a Rush concert in St. John's
 1990: Alex's Interview for Artist of the Decade (1980s) (Easter egg) - Outtakes from Alex Lifeson's Artist of the Decade interview

Running Time: 2 hours 8 minutes

CD disc 1
 "R30 Overture" – ("Finding My Way", "Anthem", "Bastille Day", "A Passage to Bangkok", "Cygnus X-1", "Hemispheres") – 6:42
 "The Spirit of Radio" – 5:05
 "Force Ten" – 4:49
 "Animate" – 5:49
 "Subdivisions" – 6:09
 "Earthshine" – 5:41
 "Red Barchetta" – 6:49
 "Roll the Bones" – 6:22
 "The Seeker" – 3:27
 "Tom Sawyer" – 5:00
 "Dreamline" – 5:20

Running Time: 61:19

CD disc 2
 "Between the Wheels" – 6:17
 "Mystic Rhythms" – 5:22
 "Der Trommler" – 9:01
 "Resist" – 4:33
 "Heart Full of Soul" – 2:44
 "2112" ("Overture"/"Temples of Syrinx"/"Grand Finale") – 8:24
 "Xanadu" (abbreviated version) – 6:44
 "Working Man" – 6:14
 "Summertime Blues" – 3:41
 "Crossroads" – 3:13
 "Limelight" – 4:57

Running Time: 61:13

Blu-Ray disc
 "R30 Overture" – ("Finding My Way", "Anthem", "Bastille Day", "A Passage to Bangkok", "Cygnus X-1", "Hemispheres")
 "The Spirit of Radio"
 "Force Ten"
 "Animate"
 "Subdivisions"
 "Earthshine"
 "Red Barchetta"
 "Roll the Bones"
 "Bravado" (previously unreleased)
 "YYZ" (previously unreleased)
 "The Trees" (previously unreleased)
 "The Seeker"
 "One Little Victory" (previously unreleased)
 "Tom Sawyer"
 "Dreamline"
 "Secret Touch" (previously unreleased)
 "Between the Wheels"
 "Mystic Rhythms"
 "Red Sector A" (previously unreleased)
 "Der Trommler"
 "Resist"
 "Heart Full of Soul"
 "2112" ("Overture"/"Temples of Syrinx"/"Grand Finale")
 "La Villa Strangiato" (previously unreleased)
 "By-Tor and the Snow Dog" (previously unreleased)
 "Xanadu" (abbreviated version)
 "Working Man"
 "Summertime Blues"
 "Crossroads"
 "Limelight"
Full concert running time: 182 minutes
plus the extra features of the second DVD (127 minutes)

Band members
 Geddy Lee – bass and acoustic guitars, keyboards, vocals
 Alex Lifeson – electric and acoustic guitars, bass pedal synth
 Neil Peart – drums, percussion

Certifications

References

External links
 Rush's official website

Rush (band) video albums
2005 live albums
Live video albums
2005 video albums
Anthem Records live albums
Anthem Records video albums
Atlantic Records live albums
Atlantic Records video albums
Rush (band) live albums